The Dalton-Uphoff House (also known as the David Delaney House) is a historic house located near Stewartsville, DeKalb County, Missouri.

Description and history 
It was built about 1850, and is a two-story brick dwelling with an ell shaped plan and a gabled roof. It was designed by Richmond Dalton, and is one of two examples of brick architecture in the county (the other is the Absolom Riggs House).

It was listed on the National Register of Historic Places on April 12, 1982.

References

Houses on the National Register of Historic Places in Missouri
Houses completed in 1865
Buildings and structures in DeKalb County, Missouri
National Register of Historic Places in DeKalb County, Missouri